Michael Finney may refer to:
 Michael Finney (magician) (born 1954), American magician
 Michael Finney (journalist), American news presenter and talk show host